Richard Catlyn (by 1520–1556), of Norwich and Honingham, Norfolk and Serjeants' Inn, London, was an English politician.

He was a Member of Parliament (MP) for Norwich in 1545.

References

1556 deaths
Politicians from Norwich
English MPs 1545–1547
People from Honingham
Year of birth uncertain